In mathematics, more precisely in measure theory, a  measure  on the real line is called a discrete measure (in respect to the Lebesgue measure) if it is concentrated on an at most countable set. The support need not be a discrete set. Geometrically, a discrete measure (on the real line, with respect to Lebesgue measure) is a collection of point masses.

Definition and properties

 

such that 
 

The simplest example of a discrete measure on the real line is the Dirac delta function  One has  and   

 
for any Lebesgue measurable set  Then, the measure

 

is a discrete measure. In fact, one may prove that any discrete measure on the real line has this form for appropriately chosen sequences  and

Extensions

One may extend the notion of discrete measures to more general measure spaces.
 
 
Notice that the first two requirements are always satisfied for an at most countable subset of the real line if  is the Lebesgue measure, so they were not necessary in the first definition above.

 

One can also define the concept of discreteness for signed measures.

References

External links

 

Measures (measure theory)